Luxi may refer to

China
Luxi City (潞西市), currently Mang City, Yunnan
Luxi County, Hunan (泸溪县)
Luxi County, Jiangxi (芦溪县)
Luxi County, Yunnan (泸西县)
Towns
Luxi, Hubei (陆溪镇), in Jiayu County
Luxi, Wuning County (鲁溪镇), Jiangxi
Written as "芦溪镇":
Luxi, Fujian, in Pinghe County
Luxi, Pingxiang, seat of Luxi County, Jiangxi
Luxi, Santai County, Sichuan
Luxi, Nanchong, in Shunqing District, Nanchong, Sichuan
Townships
Luxi Township, Anhui (芦溪乡), in Qimen County
Luxi Township, Jiangxi (芦溪乡), in Yongxin County
Luxi Township, Zhejiang (鹿西乡), in Dongtou County

India 

 Luxi, Nancowry, a village in Andaman & Nicobar Islands

Other
Luxi (fonts)
 Acyl-homoserine-lactone synthase, an enzyme